Néstor Andrés Silvera (born 14 March 1977) is a former Argentine football striker. He has played for a number of other clubs in the Argentine Primera División, as well as Tigres UANL in Mexico.

With 45 goals, Silvera is the fifth all-time highest goalscorer of Tigres UANL.

Playing & Managing Career
Silvera began his career in 1994 with his hometown team Comisión de Actividades Infantiles. He played for them in the lower leagues for 3 seasons, before transferring to Huracán in the Argentine Primera División. After one season, he moved on to Unión.

In 2001, Silvera was signed by Independiente. During the 2002 Apertura tournament he played an important role in helping Independiente claim their first Argentine league title in eight years. He was the top scorer of the tournament with 16 goals.

In 2003, Silvera was sold to Mexican side Tigres UANL, where he became top scorer in the Primera División de México for the 2004 Clausura tournament.

In 2006, he returned to Argentine football with San Lorenzo, and in 2007 he helped the club to win the Clausura tournament.

In 2009, Silvera returned to Independiente. He was part of the team that ended up as champion of the 2010 Copa Sudamericana.

In 2011, Silvera joined Belgrano de Córdoba.

In 2017 he joined Al-Hilal FC technical staff as a second assistant coach for the first football team.

Titles
Independiente
Argentine Primera División (1): 2002 Apertura
Copa Sudamericana (1): 2010
San Lorenzo
Argentine Primera División (1): 2007 Clausura

Individual honours

Goleador (top scorer), Primera Division:  Apertura 2002.
Goleador (top scorer) Primera División de México: Clausura 2004.

References

External links
 Argentine Primera statistics at Fútbol XXI 
 Profile at Football-Lineups

1977 births
Living people
People from Comodoro Rivadavia
Argentine footballers
Argentine expatriate footballers
Association football forwards
Comisión de Actividades Infantiles footballers
Club Atlético Huracán footballers
Unión de Santa Fe footballers
Club Atlético Independiente footballers
San Lorenzo de Almagro footballers
Tigres UANL footballers
Club Atlético Belgrano footballers
Club Atlético Banfield footballers
Argentine Primera División players
Liga MX players
Expatriate footballers in Mexico
Argentine expatriate sportspeople in Mexico